Chuaña (possibly from Aymara for oozing of water and other liquids / melting of metals and other things) is a mountain in the Chila mountain range in the Andes of Peru, about  high. It is situated in the Arequipa Region, Caylloma Province, Lari District. Chuaña lies north of Quehuisha and Mismi and west of Pucara. The lake Carhuacocha (possibly from Quechua for "yellowish lake") lies at its feet.

References 

Mountains of Peru
Mountains of Arequipa Region